Désert is a 1980 novel written by French Nobel laureate writer J. M. G. Le Clézio, considered to be one of his breakthrough novels. It won the Académie française's Grand Prix Paul Morand in 1980.

Plot summary
Two stories are interwoven.

The shorter, which begins and ends the book, is specifically set in 1909–1910 and later 1912, and tells of the wanderings of North African desert tribes chased from their lands by French colonial invaders, mostly as observed by a small boy, Nour. The beginning is set in the 
Saguia el-Hamra region in the Western Sahara, around the town of Smara, and the story follows the tribe on their gruelling journey across the desert to Tiznit. The story tells of Nour’s encounter with the religious leader Ma al-'Aynayn, whom he worships and follows.

The longer, the story of Lalla, is set in an unspecified contemporary time.  It describes her early life in a shanty town on the edge of an unnamed Moroccan coastal town, and particularly her friendship with a young mute Hartani shepherd who, like her, originates from the desert tribes. It narrates the time she spends in Marseille while already pregnant with the Hartani’s child. In France she encounters great poverty before becoming a photo model, but she eventually returns to her native town in Morocco, where she gives birth to the Hartani's child.

Publication history
First French edition

Second French edition

First English translated edition

First Malayalam translated edition

Reviews
Review taken from Reuters, India

Review taken from the TLS

Review taken from kirjasto.sci.fi

Review taken from Deseret News (Salt Lake City)

Review taken from World Literature Today

Review taken from Western Sahara information

Review taken from the web-page of The Hindu Group;

References

1980 French novels
Novels by J. M. G. Le Clézio
French historical novels
Novels set in Marseille
Novels set in Morocco
Novels set in the 1910s
Novels set in the 1920s
Novels set in the French colonial empire
Works by J. M. G. Le Clézio
Éditions Gallimard books